Ardicino della Porta the Younger (It.: Ardicino della Porta, iuniore) (1434–1493) (called the Cardinal of Aléria) was an Italian Roman Catholic bishop and cardinal.

Biography

Ardicino della Porta was born in Novara in 1434.  He was the grand-nephew of Cardinal Ardicino della Porta, seniore.  He was a doctor of both laws.

Early in his career, he was vicar general of the Archdiocese of Florence, in which capacity he published the interdict of Pope Paul II against Florence.  He later served as papal legate to Frederick III, Holy Roman Emperor and to Matthias Corvinus, King of Hungary to encourage them to participate in a crusade against the Ottoman Empire.  He then became a Referendary of the Roman Curia.

On February 22, 1475, he was elected Bishop of Aléria, a post he occupied until his death. He went on to serve as a datary under Pope Sixtus IV.  He would go on to serve as governor of Norcia, Terni, Perugia, and Città di Castello.  Pope Innocent VIII put him in charge of managing relations with ambassadors to the Holy See.

In the consistory of March 9, 1489, Pope Innocent VIII made him a cardinal priest.  He received the red hat on March 14, 1489 and the titular church of Santi Giovanni e Paolo on March 23, 1489.  On June 3, 1489, he became apostolic administrator of the metropolitan see of Olomouc, a post he held until February 8, 1492.

On June 2, 1492, he asked the pope to allow him to resign the cardinalate and, with the pope's permission, he retired to a Camaldolese monastery.  However, the other members of the College of Cardinals objected, and he was forced to return to Rome.

He participated in the papal conclave of 1492 that elected Pope Alexander VI.

He died in Rome on February 4, 1493. He is buried in St. Peter's Basilica.

References

1434 births
1493 deaths
15th-century Italian cardinals
People from Novara
Bishops of Olomouc
15th-century Italian Roman Catholic bishops
Bishops of Aléria